The following is a list of 2018 box office number-one films in South Korea. When the number-one film in gross is not the same as the number-one film in admissions, both are listed.

Highest-grossing films

 *Admissions and gross are only for the year 2018 and does not equate to the eventual admissions and gross of a film.

See also
List of South Korean films of 2018

References

2018
South Korea
2018 in South Korean cinema